Yen Kuan-heng (born 14 September 1977) is a Taiwanese politician. He was elected to the Legislative Yuan from Taichung in 2013, to replace his father Yen Ching-piao in office. Yen lost reelection to Chen Po-wei in 2020.

Political career
Yen Kuan-heng helped run his father's first legislative campaign in 2001, and worked as the elder Yen's legislative assistant. Yen Ching-piao was sentenced to prison in November 2012 and expelled from the Legislative Yuan, necessitating a by-election for Taichung 2.  was named the Democratic Progressive Party candidate days before the Kuomintang announced its support of Yen Kuan-heng. The by-election was held on 26 January 2013, with Yen winning by 1,138 votes. The Kuomintang nominated Yen for a second term over fellow party member  in the 2016 legislative elections, and Yen won again. In March 2016, Yen joined the Parliamentary Transparency Alliance, a smaller group of Kuomintang legislators within the Ninth Legislative Yuan. Yen narrowly lost reelection to Taiwan Statebuilding Party candidate Chen Po-wei in 2020. The Kuomintang formally nominated Yen as its candidate for the by-election on 9 November 2021.

References

1977 births
Living people
Taichung Members of the Legislative Yuan
Kuomintang Members of the Legislative Yuan in Taiwan
Members of the 8th Legislative Yuan
Members of the 9th Legislative Yuan
Dominican University of California alumni